The 2005–06 Slovak 1.Liga season was the 13th season of the Slovak 1. Liga, the second level of ice hockey in Slovakia. 12 teams participated in the league, and HC 05 Banska Bystrica won the championship.

Regular season

Playoffs

Quarterfinals

 HC 05 Banská Bystrica – HK Lietajúce kone Prešov  4:1  (2:1, 5:0k, 1:2, 4:1, 2:0)
 HC VTJ Telvis Topoľčany – MšHK Prievidza  4:1  (3:0, 6:1, 3:7, 5:4sn, 3:1)
 HK Spišská Nová Ves – HK 95 Považská Bystrica  2:4  (3:2, 0:5, 2:3, 2:7, 5:3, 3:5)
 HKm Humenné – ŠHK 37 Piešťany   4:3  (11:3, 8:2, 2:5, 1:3, 3:1, 4:5sn, 5:3)

Semifinals

 HC 05 Banská Bystrica – HK 95 Považská Bystrica   4:3  (3:2, 5:3, 0:2, 2:6, 3:5, 4:2, 5:0)
 HC VTJ Telvis Topoľčany – HKm Humenné  1:4  (5:4, 1:5, 5:6sn, 2:3PP, 4:8)

Final

 HC 05 Banská Bystrica – HKm Humenné  4:0  (5:3, 5:1, 4:2, 3:2)

Relegation 

 HK Levice – HK Ružinov 99 Bratislava 0:2 (1:6, 4:7)

External links
 Season on hockeyarchives.info

Slovak 1. Liga
Slovak 1. Liga seasons
Liga